Bithia is a genus of flies in the family Tachinidae.

Species
B. acanthophora (Rondani, 1861)
B. ancyrensis (Villeneuve, 1942)
B. demotica (Egger, 1861)
B. discreta Tschorsnig, 1986
B. geniculata (Zetterstedt, 1844)
B. glirina (Rondani, 1861)
B. golanensis (Kugler, 1971)
B. immaculata (Herting, 1971)
B. jacentkovskyi (Villeneuve, 1937)
B. modesta (Meigen, 1824)
B. proletaria (Egger, 1860)
B. spreta (Meigen, 1824

References

Tachininae
Tachinidae genera
Taxa named by Jean-Baptiste Robineau-Desvoidy